The Nizhny Novgorod electoral district was a constituency created for the 1917 Russian Constituent Assembly election. The electoral district covered the Nizhny Novgorod Governorate. Nine seats in the Constituent Assembly were assigned to the Nizhny Novgorod constituency.

Only in the Nizhny Novgorod constituency could the combined forces of clergy and far right make an electoral impact. The Christian Union for Faith and Fatherland had a relative success.

Results

The result given by Radkey, used in the table above, doesn't include List 4 - Cooperative Group, List 9 - Landowners and Progressive Democrats and List 1 - Voters Group of Gorbatovsky Uezd.

References

Electoral districts of the Russian Constituent Assembly election, 1917